The J. Whitney Goff Round Barn near Winfred, South Dakota, United States, is a round barn that was built in 1915.  It was listed on the National Register of Historic Places in 2004.

Round barns in the state were later studied, and a number more were recommended for NRHP listing.

References

Barns on the National Register of Historic Places in South Dakota
Infrastructure completed in 1915
Round barns in South Dakota
National Register of Historic Places in Lake County, South Dakota